Jevgēņijs Saproņenko (born 11 November 1978) is a Latvian Ukrainian gymnast.

His best discipline is vault where he has won silver medals in 1999 and 2001 World Championships and 2004 Summer Olympics. He has also shown good results in floor exercise.

References

External links
 
 
 
 

1978 births
Living people
Latvian male artistic gymnasts
Olympic gymnasts of Latvia
Gymnasts at the 2004 Summer Olympics
Olympic silver medalists for Latvia
Medalists at the World Artistic Gymnastics Championships
Olympic medalists in gymnastics
Latvian people of Ukrainian descent
Medalists at the 2004 Summer Olympics
Universiade medalists in gymnastics
Universiade gold medalists for Latvia
Medalists at the 2003 Summer Universiade
European champions in gymnastics